Stafford Gorman Whittle (December 5, 1849 – September 11, 1931) was born at the family home Woodstock in Mecklenburg County, Virginia.  His early education was received in Norfolk but, when the American Civil War began, he continued his studies with a tutor at his father's home in Botetourt County.  Later, he attended Chatham Male Institute in Pittsylvania County and entered Washington College when he was eighteen.  The following year, 1868, he studied law at the University of Virginia.  In 1871, he was admitted to the bar and began practice in Martinsville, Virginia.  Ten years later, February 1, 1881, he was appointed judge of the Fourth Judicial Circuit.  He served there until March 1882, when he was defeated by the Readjuster Party.  In 1885, however, he was elected for the full term and served until he was elected to the Supreme Court of Appeals in 1901.  He became president of the court in 1917 and continued so until 1919 when he resigned.  Returning to Martinsville, where Whittle had a long association with Christ Episcopal Church, Stafford Gorman Whittle spent the remaining years with his family.
`

See also
 Kennon C. Whittle

References

External links
Captain William Conway Whittle, Confederate Navy, father of Stafford Gorman Whittle, victorianvilla.com

1849 births
1931 deaths
People from Martinsville, Virginia
People from Mecklenburg County, Virginia
University of Virginia School of Law alumni
Virginia lawyers
Justices of the Supreme Court of Virginia